Forest Ridge School of the Sacred Heart is a private, Roman Catholic, all-girls middle school and high school in Bellevue, Washington, USA.  The school is a member of the Society of the Sacred Heart schools and is part of the global Network of Sacred Heart Schools.  Forest Ridge educates girls in grades 5 through 12.

History
Forest Ridge was established in Seattle in 1907 as the Convent of the Sacred Heart- Forest Ridge by the Religious of the Sacred Heart. The informal name was Forest Ridge Convent or FRC.  The school relocated to Somerset Hill in Bellevue in 1971, and the Seattle building was sold to the Seattle Hebrew Academy, which is still located there. Currently, Forest Ridge's informal names are FR or FRS (for Forest Ridge School). 
In 2006, Forest Ridge made major additions and renovations to its campus, notably the main high school building, the main offices and chapel housed in the Sacred Heart Center, and the science labs.

Athletics
Forest Ridge offers a no-cut policy. Students can choose from a variety of sports such as soccer, cross country, basketball, volleyball, lacrosse, softball, track, tennis and golf.

References

External links
 School Website
 Network of Sacred Heart Schools
 Private School Review
 Greatschools.org

High schools in King County, Washington
Private middle schools in Washington (state)
Catholic secondary schools in Washington (state)
Schools in Bellevue, Washington
Educational institutions established in 1907
Sacred Heart schools in the United States
Schools accredited by the Northwest Accreditation Commission
High schools within the Archdiocese of Seattle
International Baccalaureate schools in Washington (state)
1907 establishments in Washington (state)
Girls' schools in Washington (state)